Lin Shu-chen is a Taiwanese politician. She was the Administrative Deputy Minister of Education from 22 October 2013 until 20 May 2016.

References

Living people
Taiwanese Ministers of Education
Year of birth missing (living people)
National Taiwan University alumni